McCrudden is a surname. Notable people with the surname include:

Dan McCrudden (born 1955), American soccer player
Ian McCrudden, American film director
Michael McCrudden (born 1986), Canadian Internet personality
Niall McCrudden (died 2010), Irish music promoter

See also
McCrudden light machine rifle, an Australian light machine gun